Crateranthus is a genus of woody plant in the family Lecythidaceae, first described as a genus in 1913. It is native to tropical Africa (Nigeria, Cameroon, Gabon, Republic of Congo, Democratic Republic of Congo).

Species
 Crateranthus cameroonensis Cheek & Prance – Cameroon
 Crateranthus congolensis Lecomte – Gabon, Democratic Republic of Congo
 Crateranthus le-testui Lecomte – Gabon, Republic of Congo
 Crateranthus talbotii Baker f. – Cameroon, Gabon, southern Nigeria

References

Lecythidaceae
Ericales genera
Taxonomy articles created by Polbot